Paul Hays or Hayes may refer to:

 Paul Hays, reader clerk
 Paul R. Hays (1903–1980), American judge 
 Paul Hayes (born 1983), English footballer
 Paul Hayes (antiques expert) (born 1970), English antiques expert
 Paul Hayes (composer) (born 1951), Irish composer
 Paul Hayes (historian) (1942–1995), English academic

See also
Paul Hay, footballer